Isaac Edward Slade (born May 26, 1981) is an American singer and musician; the former lead vocalist, main songwriter, pianist and co-founder of Colorado-based rock band The Fray.

Early life
Slade was born in Boulder, Colorado, and raised in the Denver metropolitan area with his family, which included both parents—who were missionaries from the same family—and two younger brothers, Caleb and Micah. He also lived for a time in Guatemala due to his parents' profession, where he studied at Interamerican School in the city of Quetzaltenango. The Slade family are of English and Slovak descent. He attended Faith Christian Academy in Arvada, Colorado and later attended the University of Colorado Denver, as a music and entertainment industry studies major. He received a Bachelor of Music.

Slade started singing when he was 8 years old, and began playing the piano at 11, after temporarily losing his voice. He wrote his first song when he was 16 and learned to play guitar when he was in high school.

Career

Formation and early stages
Slade joined Ember, a band which consisted of Slade and his future band-mates Dave Welsh and Ben Wysocki. The band soon dissolved, and later, in the spring of 2002, Slade ran into former school-mate and vocalist/guitarist Joe King in a record store. The two began regular jam sessions, which led to writing songs. They later added Slade's younger brother, Caleb, on bass and Zach Johnson on drums.

Dave Welsh and Ben Wysocki re-joined Slade and King, to form the Fray. They soon released Movement EP, and in 2003, they released Reason EP to some local critical acclaim, particularly by Denver's Westword alternative newsweekly. Despite these reviews, the band struggled to launch a single. Denver radio station KTCL rejected eight of their songs before the band decided to submit "Cable Car". The song found airplay on a KTCL radio show highlighting local bands and the radio station received a large number of requests for it soon thereafter. The band changed the name of the song to "Over My Head (Cable Car)", and by the end of 2005, it had become KTCL's most played song of the year.

Departure from The Fray
On March 12, 2022, Slade announced on Instagram that he had parted ways with the Fray, with his final concert with the band held at Genesee Theatre in Waukegan, Illinois, on May 14, 2022.

Influences

Slade stated in an interview that one of the first songs that inspired him was "Swallowed" by Bush, and that the lyrics and tune had moved him enough to pursue his career. In a post on AOL Radio Blog, he wrote:

As a boy "Swallowed" was my siren's song. I was a sheltered church child and here's this man talking about living the life his way, doing whatever he felt like doing. Bush wasn't allowed in my house either, which made it that much more mysterious.

His other musical influences include Nine Inch Nails, Queen, Radiohead, R.E.M., Counting Crows, U2, and Led Zeppelin.

Philanthropy
Slade performed on the 2010 remake of the 1985 charity single "We Are the World". He joined 85 other artists on February 1, 2010, to record the track for the victims of the 2010 Haiti earthquake.

On October 27, 2013, Slade and the Fray played at the Colorado Flood Benefit Concert that raised nearly $500,000 for victims of the flood.

Political views 
Slade considers himself to be a centrist. He often votes for independent candidates. Slade sponsored Neal Simon, who was running as an independent candidate for senator from Maryland during the 2018 elections.

References

1981 births
Living people
American Christians
American people of Slovak descent
American rock singers
American rock pianists
American male pianists
American tenors
APRA Award winners
The Fray members
University of Colorado Denver alumni
Singers from Denver
21st-century American singers
21st-century American pianists
21st-century American male singers